Peter Gilfillan (born 29 December 1965) is a former professional Canadian soccer defender.

Club career
Peter was drafted to the North American Soccer League by the Toronto Blizzard in 1983. He was a member of the Toronto Blizzard from 1983 to 1987 (NASL and CSL). In 1988 he played for the Hamilton Steelers in the Canadian Soccer League. After leaving Wilfrid Laurier University in 1990 he joined Ottawa Intrepid of the Canadian Soccer League. He also played for the Kitchener Spirit/Kickers and the North York Rockets in the CSL. Peter was selected Canadian University CIAU/CIS All Canadian All-star for all 4 years in University from 1986 to 1990. He worked for Umbro Soccer and Adidas Canada after retiring from the game. He also served as the general manager at an online recruitment company.

International career
Peter was a member of the U19 Canadian team in 1984. The U19 team was CONCACAF finalists in Trinidad & Tobago - where the team qualified for the World Youth Cup in Russia along with Mexico in 1984. Gilfillan played all three of Canada's games at the 1985 FIFA World Youth Championship, in a side that also comprised Alex Bunbury. He was member of the Men's Gold medal Canadian National team at the Francophone games 1988 in Morocco, Africa and was selected to represent the Canadian World Cup team - 3 Nations Cup in Vancouver – versus USA and Mexico 1990 and; selected to represent the Canadian World Cup team - 3 Nations Cup in Los Angeles versus USA and Mexico 1991 and; selected to represent the Canadian at the CONCACAF Gold Cup, Los Angeles 1991. He made his senior debut for Canada in a July 1991 CONCACAF Gold Cup match against Jamaica.
Peter is a member of the Canadian Soccer Hall of Fame.

External links

Profile - Golden Hawk Athletics

References

1965 births
Living people
Association football defenders
Canadian soccer players
Wilfrid Laurier Golden Hawks soccer players
Canada men's youth international soccer players
Canada men's international soccer players
Toronto Blizzard (1986–1993) players
Hamilton Steelers (1981–1992) players
Ottawa Intrepid players
Kitchener Spirit players
North York Rockets players
Canadian Soccer League (1987–1992) players
1991 CONCACAF Gold Cup players